VETIGEL is a veterinary product, a plant-derived injectable gel that is claimed to quickly stop traumatic bleeding on external and internal wounds.  Its name is coined from Medi-Gel, from the video game series Mass Effect. It uses  a plant-based haemophilic polymer made from polysaccharides that  forms a mesh which seals  the wound. It is manufactured by Cresilon, Inc., an American biotechnology company, which is also exploring human products derived from its technology, slated to launch as early as 2016. The company plans on releasing a product for the military and the emergency medicine market first, followed by a product for the human surgical market when FDA approval is granted.

Cresilon, Inc. (Formerly Suneris, Inc.) is headquartered in Brooklyn, New York City, United States. The company was founded in 2010 by Joe Landolina and Isaac Miller, while they were students at NYU Poly. Cresilon focuses on  wound care products, specifically those in the field of hemostasis. The company operates out of a 25,000 sq. ft. manufacturing facility located in  Sunset Park, Brooklyn, NY.

References

External links
 https://cresilon.com/index.php/vetigel/

Videos
http://www.medicaldaily.com/college-student-joe-landolina-creates-healing-gel-how-does-veti-gel-work-video-244683

Biotechnology products
Products introduced in 2010
Gels